The zinc 5-cent coin was minted in the Netherlands between 1941 and 1943 during World War II. It was worth 1/20, or .05, of the guilder, and designed by Nico de Haas, a Dutch national-socialist.

Mintage

References

Netherlands in World War II
Modern obsolete currencies
Currencies of Europe
Zinc and aluminum coins minted in Germany and occupied territories during World War II
Coins of the Netherlands
Five-cent coins